Aberdeen F.C. competed in the Scottish Premier Division, Scottish League Cup and Scottish Cup in season 1997–98.

They finished sixth in the Scottish Premier Division and were eliminated in the third round of the Scottish Cup. They reached the quarter final of the Scottish League Cup. Manager Roy Aitken was sacked in November following a 0–5 defeat to Dundee United and was replaced by Alex Miller.

Results

Scottish Premier Division

Final standings

Scottish League Cup

Scottish Cup

References

 afcheritage.org 

Aberdeen F.C. seasons
Aberdeen